Mullah Sayyad Mohammad was selected to represent Kandahar Province in Afghanistan's Meshrano Jirga, the upper house of its National Legislature, in 2005.  He is a member of the Pashtun ethnic group from the Barakzai tribe. A report on Kandahar prepared at the Navy Postgraduate School stated he is from the "Payam-e-Solh political faction".  It states he sits on the armed services committee.  It states he has a bachelor's degree.

References

Politicians of Kandahar Province
Living people
Members of the House of Elders (Afghanistan)
Pashtun people
Year of birth missing (living people)